Média-Participations is a French media concern, controlled by a Belgian holding concern, specialized in Franco-Belgian comics. It has some forty publishers in its portfolio, including Dupuis, Dargaud, Le Lombard, Fleurus, La Martinière, and Abrams.

History
Média-Participations was created in 1986 by Rémy Montagne, a politician who had been a member of the French Parliament for three decades before starting in the publishing business. After his death in 1991, he was succeeded by his son Vincent.
The company was first called Ampère and focused on the acquisition of a number of struggling Christian publishing houses like Fleurus. In 1986, the group changed its name to Média-Participations and focused more on Franco-Belgian comics, which started when they acquired Le Lombard in 1986 and Dargaud in 1988.

In 2004, Média-Participations acquired Dupuis after a bid on Editis failed. In 2008, Média-Participations renewed its bid on Editis, now for more than €1 billion.

The publisher is now the third largest publisher of France, and the major Franco-Belgian comics publisher. Of the 32 million books published a year, 20 million are comics. Magazine sales also reach 30 million copies a year. The group publishes around 600 publications a year, some 13% of the total number of Franco-Belgian comics, but these represent almost a third of the sales of comics in France.

In 2009 it acquired a French computer software company, Anuman Interactive.

In 2018, the company acquired La Martinière Groupe.

Current structure

Comics
Comics and manga are published by six different publishers: the general audience publishers of Franco-Belgian comics Dupuis, Dargaud and Le Lombard, the publisher of manga Kana, and the specialized publishers  (for Lucky Luke) and Blake et Mortimer.

Animation
Belvision
Dreamwall
Dargaud Media
Ellipsanime
Dupuis Audiovisuel
Mediatoon Distribution
Storimages

Magazines
Spirou, published by Dupuis
Famille chrétienne, published by Edifa
different magazines by Rustica, including Système D

Books
Editions Chronique for thematic publications
Le Ballon for children's books
Fleurus for a wide variety of books, including many children's books
La Martinière Groupe

VideoGames
 Syberia Series (as. Syberia, Syberia II and Syberia III is in development.) by: Microïds an Anuman software brand.
 Still Life series (as. Post Mortem, Still Life and Still Life 2) by: Microïds 
 Dracula Series

Notes

External links
Homepage

Christian publishing companies
Magazine publishing companies of France
Publishing companies established in 1986
French companies established in 1986